Liparis hawaiensis, known as the Hawai'i widelip orchid, is a species of orchid that is endemic to the Hawaiian Islands.

References

hawaiensis
Endemic flora of Hawaii
Orchids of Oceania
Orchids of the United States
Taxa named by Carl Ludwig Blume
Flora without expected TNC conservation status